Phil Bennett (born 6 October 1971 in Kingswinford) is a British auto racing driver.

He started circuit racing in 1998 with a one make Rover 216GTi, racing in the BRSCC Super Coupe Cup - finishing 2nd.  He then finished 3rd in the 1999 Renault Spider Cup. In 2001 he joined Team Egg Sport to race a Vauxhall Astra in the BTCC, in the first year of BTC-Touring regulations. Against a thin field he came 4th overall, behind only the other Vauxhalls of Jason Plato, Yvan Muller and James Thompson. For 2002 and 2003 he raced for Proton's unsuccessful factory team. He also made a one-off appearance in the RenaultSport Clio Trophy at Donington in 2002 

In 2004 Bennett raced in the Le Mans Endurance Series (LMES) in a GTS Saleen S7-R, whilst 2005 he moved to sportscars and a Courage C-65 LMP2 machine, racing in the LMES, Le Mans 24hrs, Sebring 12hr (ALMS) and Petit Le Mans. In 2006 he won a V8Star race at Donington Park.

He has appeared on the TV show Faking It, helping a young man pretend to be a professional racing driver.

He is now a fully qualified flying instructor and owner of Silverstone-based Gyrocopter Flying Club.

Racing record

Complete British Touring Car Championship results
(key) (Races in bold indicate pole position - 1 point awarded) (Races in italics indicate fastest lap - 1 point awarded) * signifies that driver lead race for at least one lap - 1 point awarded (2001-2002 just for feature race, 2003 all races)

24 Hours of Le Mans results

Britcar 24 Hour results

References

External links
 Official site

1971 births
Living people
British Touring Car Championship drivers
English racing drivers
24 Hours of Le Mans drivers
European Le Mans Series drivers
24 Hours of Spa drivers
Britcar 24-hour drivers
British GT Championship drivers
Nürburgring 24 Hours drivers